Ashqout (also spelled Ashkout, Achqout, `Ashqut) is a town and municipality in the Keserwan District of the Keserwan-Jbeil Governorate of Lebanon. It is located 31 kilometers north of Beirut. Ashqout's average elevation is 1,000 meters above sea level and its total land area is 588 hectares. Its inhabitants are predominantly Maronite Catholic, with Christians from other denominations in the minority.

Ottoman tax records indicate Ashqout had 43 Christian households in 1523, 43 Christian households and seven bachelors in 1530, and 33 Christian households and 14 bachelors in 1543.

The town has three schools, one public and two private, in the town, with a total of 739 students as of 2008. The El-Hajj Hospital, which has 28 beds, is located in Ashqout. It is the birthplace of Ahmad Faris Shidyaq (1804–1887); Paul Peter Massad (1806–1890); and Rayyane Tabet (born 1983).

References

Bibliography

Populated places in Keserwan District
Maronite Christian communities in Lebanon